INS Imphal is the third ship of the Visakhapatnam-class stealth guided missile destroyer of the Indian Navy. She is being constructed at Mazagon Dock Limited (MDL) and has been launched on 20 April 2019. The ship is expected to be commissioned by 2023.

The ship was named in recognition of the Indian soldiers who fought in Battle of Imphal during World War II. It is the first Indian Navy ship named after a city in Northeast India.

Construction
The keel of Imphal was laid down on 19 May 2017, and she was launched on 20 April 2019 at Mazagon Dock Limited of Mumbai.

See also

References

Visakhapatnam-class destroyers
Destroyers of the Indian Navy
2019 ships
Ships built in India